Orchidology is the scientific study of orchids. It is an organismal-level branch of botany.

See also 
List of orchidologists

References 

 The orchidology of H. G. Jones. Eric A. Christenson, Brittonia, January–March 1994, Volume 46, Issue 1, pages 57–61,

External links 
 Definition at www.merriam-webster.com